The R331 is a Regional Route in South Africa that connects the R102 and N2 near Thornhill in the east with the R332 near Baviaanskloof Nature Reserve in the west via Hankey and Patensie.

Route
From route's western origin at the R332 it heads east into Patensie. Leaving the town, it heads south-east, reaching Hankey, where it meets the R330's northern origin. It heads east-south-east out the town to intersect the N2 and then end immediately afterward at the R102.

External links
 Routes Travel Info

References

Regional Routes in the Eastern Cape